Scharbeutz (Polabian Scorbuze) is a municipality in the district of Ostholstein, in Schleswig-Holstein, Germany. It is situated on the Bay of Lübeck (Baltic Sea), approx. 20 km north of Lübeck, and 15 km southeast of Eutin.

See also
Taschensee

References

External links 

Seaside resorts in Germany
Ostholstein
Bay of Lübeck
Populated coastal places in Germany (Baltic Sea)